Mercedes Paz and Eva Pfaff were the defending champions but they competed with different partners that year, Paz with Mary Lou Daniels and Pfaff with Zina Garrison.

Daniels and Paz lost in the second round to Bettina Fulco and Emilse Raponi-Longo.

Garrison and Pfaff lost in the semifinals to Lori McNeil and Martina Navratilova.

McNeil and Navratilova won in the final 6–2, 2–6, 6–3 against Claudia Kohde-Kilsch and Gabriela Sabatini.

Seeds
Champion seeds are indicated in bold text while text in italics indicates the round in which those seeds were eliminated. The top four seeded teams received byes into the second round.

Draw

Final

Top half

Bottom half

External links
 ITF tournament edition details

1988 Doubles
1988 WTA Tour